Villanueva de San Juan is a city located in the province of Seville, Spain. According to the 2005 census, the city has a population of 1440 inhabitants.

References

External links
Villanueva de San Juan - Sistema de Información Multiterritorial de Andalucía

Municipalities of the Province of Seville